Adarsh Gramin Inter College (AGIC) is an intermediate college in Chandok, Bijnor district, Uttar Pradesh,

Adarsh Gramin Inter College (popularly known as AGIC ) is a one of school under  RAM SHIKSHA PRASAR SAMITI, Chandok, India. The present Manager of school is Dr. Birbal Singh. Various members are Mr. Tapraj Singh, Mr. Brij Kumar, Mr. Vipin Kumar, Mr. Anil Kumar, Mr. Brijraj Singh, and other respected people.  This school provide education from VI to XII standard (Now junior sections too). AGIC is one of the best school of District. Bijnor

Intermediate colleges in Uttar Pradesh
Bijnor district
1987 establishments in India
Educational institutions established in 1987